The sixth HMS Harrier was a .  She was launched at Devonport Dockyard on 20 February 1894, and saw service in the Mediterranean and in fishery protection.  She served as a minesweeper during World War I and was sold for commercial use in 1920.

Design

Ordered under the Naval Defence Act of 1889, which established the "Two-Power Standard", the class was contemporary with the first torpedo boat destroyers. Harrier was engined by Hawthorn Leslie and Company with two sets of vertical triple-expansion steam engines, two locomotive-type boilers, and twin screws. She carried between 100 and 160 tons of coal and was manned by 120 sailors and officers.

Armament
The armament when built comprised two QF  guns, four 6-pdr guns and a single 5-barrelled Nordenfelt machine gun.  Her primary weapon was five 18-inch (450-mm) torpedo tubes, with two reloads.  On conversion to a minesweeper in 1914 two of the five torpedoes were removed.

History

Mediterranean service
Harriers first commission was spent on the Mediterranean Station. She deployed to Crete in February 1897 to operate as part of the International Squadron, a multinational force made up of ships of the Austro-Hungarian Navy, French Navy, Imperial German Navy, Italian Royal Navy (Regia Marina), Imperial Russian Navy, and Royal Navy that intervened in the 1897-1898 Greek uprising on Crete against rule by the Ottoman Empire. On 21 February 1897, she joined the British battleship  and torpedo gunboat , the Russian battleship , the Austro-Hungarian armored cruiser , and the German protected cruiser  in the International Squadron's first direct offensive action, a brief bombardment of Cretan insurgent positions on the heights east of Canea (now Chania) after the insurgents refused the squadron′s order to take down a Greek flag they had raised.

Lieutenant Commander Philip Walter was appointed in command in July 1897. She left Port Said for Malta on 8 February 1900, arrived at Plymouth on 1 March, and on 24 March 1900 paid off at Devonport, where she was placed in the B division of the Fleet Reserve. Commander Cyril Everard Tower was appointed in command on 11 March 1901, following which she again returned to the Mediterranean Station, and in late November 1901 replaced the  Melita as the special service vessel at Constantinople. She visited the Danube in early 1902, and was ordered to the Persian Gulf on special service in June that year. After a brief visit to the Mediterranean in September for combined manoeuvres off Nauplia, she was back in the Gulf visiting Aden and Perim the following month, then Hodeida in December.

Fishery protection and tender to the Navigation School
She spent some time before World War I engaged in fishery protection duties and was for a time a tender to the Navigation School.

Conversion to a minesweeper
At the outbreak of war she was converted at Portsmouth, in common with most of the rest of her class, to the minesweeping role.

Disposal
She was sold to T R Sales at Haulbowline, Cork on 23 February 1920 for commercial use.

Notes

Citations

Bibliography

 McTiernan, Mick, A Very Bad Place Indeed For a Soldier. The British involvement in the early stages of the European Intervention in Crete. 1897 - 1898, King's College, London, September 2014.

 

Dryad-class torpedo gunboats
Ships built in Plymouth, Devon
1894 ships
Victorian-era gunboats of the United Kingdom
World War I minesweepers of the United Kingdom